Pachinko is an American drama television series created by Soo Hugh based on the 2017 novel by Min Jin Lee. The series is directed by Kogonada and Justin Chon and stars Youn Yuh-jung, Lee Min-ho, Kim Min-ha, and Jin Ha. It premiered on Apple TV+ on March 25, 2022.  In April 2022, the series was renewed for a second season.

It received critical acclaim, particularly for its cinematography, writing, and the performances of the cast, most notably that of Kim Min-ha, Youn Yuh-jung, and Lee Min-ho.

Cast

Main 
 Youn Yuh-jung as Kim Sunja (whose Japanese name is Bando Nobuko), the main protagonist of Pachinko. She is a Korean woman from Yeongdo-gu, Busan, South Korea, who fights for a better life in a Korea dominated by the Japanese.
 Kim Min-ha as teenage Sunja
 Yu-na as childhood Sunja
 Soji Arai as Baek Mozasu (whose Japanese name is Bando Mozasu), a wealthy businessman who owns several pachinko parlors. He is Sunja's second son (the first and only child fathered by Isak) and Noa's half-brother.
 Carter Jeong and Koren Lee as baby Mozasu
 Jin Ha as Solomon Baek, the son of Baek Mozasu and grandson of Sunja. Educated at English-speaking schools and Yale University, he has always socialized with Americans and Westerners.
 Yoon Kyung-ho as teenage Solomon
 Han Jun-woo as Baek Yoseb, Isak's second older brother who lives in Osaka, Japan. He is Kyunghee's husband and Sunja's brother-in-law.
 Jeong In-ji as Yangjin, Sunja's mother, runs a boardinghouse in Yeongdo.
 Jung Eun-chae as Kyunghee (whose Japanese name is Bando Kimiko), Yoseb's wife and Sunja's sister-in-law. She quickly becomes a best-friend figure for Sunja after they first meet in Japan.
 Felice Choi as older Kyunghee
 Lee Min-ho as Koh Hansu, a Zainichi Korean man who lives in Osaka, Japan. Introduced as a merchant and fish broker who regularly visits Busan, South Korea. He is Noa's father.
 Kaho Minami as Etsuko, Hana's mother and Mozasu's girlfriend.
 Noh Sang-hyun as Baek Isak, a Protestant minister from Pyongyang, Korea. He marries Sunja despite his oscillating health condition to save her honour by giving her his surname. He is Yoseb's younger brother, Noa's step-father and Mozasu's father.
 Anna Sawai as Naomi, Solomon's co-worker at the Tokyo branch, graduated from Harvard Business School.
 Jimmi Simpson as Tom Andrews, Solomon's superior at the Tokyo branch.

Recurring 
 Louis Ozawa as Mamoru Yoshii, a client of Shiffley's
 Takahiro Inoue as Arimoto, Solomon's co-worker at the Tokyo branch.
 Park Hye-jin as Han Geum-ja
 Yoshio Maki as Katsu Abe, a client of Shiffley's
 Martin Martinez as Angelo, Mozasu's employee
 Ryotaro Sugimoto as Tetsuya, Solomon's classmate at International School.
 Dakatade Shoumin as teenage Tetsuya
 Mari Yamamoto as Hana, Etsuko's daughter and Solomon's ex-girlfriend.
 Jung Ye-bin as teenage Hana
 Yoriko Haraguchi as Hansu's Japanese wife
 Hiro Kanagawa as Mr. Goto, Mozasu's friend
 Jeong So-ri as Jiyun, a rich Korean girl 
 Yeon Ye-ji as Shin Bokhee, Donghee's older sister, work at Kim's boardinghouse.
 Kim Young-ok as older Bokhee
 Kim Bo-min as Shin Donghee, Bokhee's younger sister, work at Kim's boardinghouse.
 Kim Dha-sol as Sung Chung, one of the Chung brothers who lived in Kim's boardinghouse.
 Ku Sung-hwan as Fatso Chung, one of the Chung brothers who lived in Kim's boardinghouse.
 Park Min-i as Gombo Chung, one of the Chung brothers who lived in Kim's boardinghouse.

Guest 
 Lee Dae-ho as Kim Hoonie, Sunja's father
 Jeon So-hyun as a mudang, a female shaman
 Leo Joo as Song Byung-ho, a fisherman who lived in Kim's boardinghouse
 Lee Ji-hye as a Korean singer
 Hiromitsu Takeda as Totoyama Haruki, Mozasu's best friend
 Rome Kanda as a Japanese doctor
 Jung Woong-in as Koh Jong-yul, Hansu's father 
 Takashi Yamaguchi as Ryochi, Koh's employer
 Kerry Knuppe as Mrs. Holmes, Andrew's mother
 Jimmy Bennett as Andrew Holmes, Hansu's tutoring student
 Bob Frazer as Mr. Holmes, Andrew's father, an American businessman
 Dai Hasegawa as Ryochi's son
 Lee Hyun-ri as Kiyo, Jong-yul's girlfriend
 Hideo Kimura as Mr. Shimamura, Yoseb's boss
 Park Jae-jun as Baek Noa, Sunja's first son, Hansu's biological son

Episodes

Production
In August 2018, Apple Inc. obtained the rights to the series, which was given a series order in April 2019. The reports also included that Soo Hugh would act as showrunner, writer, and executive producer for the series. The production company, Media Res, would also produce alongside Hugh. In October 2020, Lee Min-ho, Jin Ha, Anna Sawai, Minha Kim, Soji Arai, and Kaho Minami were announced to star, with South Korean filmmaker Kogonada and Justin Chon set to executive producer and direct four episodes each. Soo Hugh said it took six to seven months of worldwide search to cast the main actors and that she had asked all her actors to audition for their roles. Filming was set to commence on October 26, 2020, in South Korea, Japan, and North America. Lee Min-ho said he had finished filming in Busan, South Korea, in December 2020 and that he was preparing to film in Canada. Filming in Vancouver was scheduled to take place between February 6 and April 9, 2021.

The show's opening theme song is "Let's Live for Today" by The Grass Roots. Hugh said she originally thought about selecting "Out of Time" by The Rolling Stones but they were unable to secure the rights to that song. The title sequence was shot several times with different songs until "Let's Live for Today" was added during post-production.

On April 29, 2022, Apple renewed the series for a second season. Filming is scheduled to take place in Toronto from January 9 to March 27, 2023, and in Japan from March 27 to June 16, 2023. Leanne Welham will direct four episodes of the second season.

Release
The series consisting of 8 episodes, produced in three languages, Korean, Japanese, and English premiered on March 25, 2022, on Apple TV+ with 3 episodes. One episode was released every Friday until April 29, 2022.

Reception

Critical response
On Rotten Tomatoes, the series is "Certified Fresh" and holds an approval rating of 98% based on 57 critic reviews, with an average rating of 9.20/10. The website's critical consensus reads, "Intricate yet intimate, Pachinko is a sweeping epic that captures the arc of history as well as the enduring bonds of family." On Metacritic, it has a score of 87 out of 100 based on 29 critics, indicating "universal acclaim".

The standalone "Episode 7" starring Lee Min-ho and directed by Kogonada is listed as one of the best TV episodes of 2022 by The New York Times, Rolling Stone and Collider.

Critics' top ten list

Accolades

See also
 Korean diaspora
 Koreans in Japan
 Koreans in New York City
 Koreatown, Manhattan (맨해튼 코리아타운)
 Korean journalists in New York City

References

External links 
 
 
 Official pilot screenplay

Apple TV+ original programming
2020s American drama television series
2022 American television series debuts
English-language television shows
Korean-language television shows
Japanese-language television shows
Television shows based on American novels
Television shows filmed in Vancouver
Television series set in Korea under Japanese rule
Refugees and displaced people in fiction
Japan in non-Japanese culture
Zainichi Korean culture